The 1952 World Table Tennis Championships women's doubles was the 18st edition of the women's doubles championship.
Shizuki Narahara and Tomie Nishimura defeated Diane Rowe and Rosalind Rowe in the final by three sets to nil.

Results

See also
List of World Table Tennis Championships medalists

References

-
1952 in women's table tennis